Rapsgaliwn is an S4C programme for pre-school children. It is shown on the Welsh-language children's television programming strand, Cyw.

Rapsgaliwn is a rapper, who claims to be 'the best rapper in the world'. Recognised for wearing gold. He is Dona Direidi's cousin.  Each episode revolves around children asking him a question and he produces a rap with the answer after doing a bit of research.  

Despite being a Welsh language programme for Welsh speaking children, English subtitles are usually available with the phrases reworded in order to maintain a rhyming pattern after translation.

References 

British preschool education television series